The IPSC Nordic Mini Rifle Championship is a yearly IPSC level 3 rifle championship hosted in either Norway, Sweden, Finland or Denmark.

Nordic champions 
The following is a list of current and past champions.

Overall category

Lady category

Senior category

See also 
 IPSC Nordic Handgun Championship
 IPSC Nordic Rifle Championship
 IPSC Nordic Shotgun Championship

References 

Match Results 2013 Nordic Rifle Championship, Sweden

IPSC shooting competitions
Shooting sports in Europe by country
Sport in Scandinavia
Inter-Nordic sports competitions